Money disorders  are the maladaptive patterns of financial beliefs and behaviors that lead to clinically significant distress, impairment in social or occupational functioning, due to financial strain or an inability to appropriately enjoy one's financial resources. Also known as financial strain, it is a belief that there is never enough money available to pay bills or provide the necessities of life. With the exception of pathological gambling and compulsive buying, psychology and the mental health fields have largely neglected dysfunctional money disorders. The term is contentious among mental health professionals and as of 2017, money disorder is not a clinical diagnosis in either the DSM or ICD medical classifications of diseases and medical disorders. Although, it is debated that money disorders and financial strain are some of the worst chronic stressors affecting people on an ongoing basis.

Types of behaviors, or “scripts”, related to money disorders include money avoidance, money worship, money status and money vigilance. Some mental health practitioners say that those affected by money disorders or who have problematic money beliefs can seek financial therapy. With financial therapy, financial planners and relationship therapists work together to provide comprehensive treatment to clients experiencing financial distress.

Symptoms
Signs and symptoms that can show and lead to money disorders are engaging in addictive gambling, Financial infidelity, compulsive expenditure and prince charming syndrome. People with money disorders often don't realize that they are in that state or that they need help. And for those who know their state, they typically find it hard to change their behaviors. Some try to shift their behaviors but are unable to make the changes long-lasting. The result is that most of these people feel ashamed of their behaviors and hide them from others, hence making it difficult for them to get help as needed.

Prince Charming Syndrome

People with prince charming syndrome have the need to wait on an outside source of financial income to come to save your financial debt such as the lottery, government assistance, or family inheritance. People who depend on others or seek for others to depend on their income to survive, more than likely with prince charming syndrome.

Addictive gambling

Is an urge to gamble continuously despite harmful negative consequences or a desire to stop. Problem gambling is often defined by whether harm is experienced by the gambler or others, rather than by the gambler's behavior. Severe problem gambling may be diagnosed as clinical pathological gambling if the gambler meets certain criteria. Pathological gambling is a common disorder that is associated with both social and family costs. If engaging in addictive gambling continues for more than a 12-month period according to the DSM-V. Factors that lead to this symptom Needs to gamble with increasing amounts of money in order to achieve the desired excitement, Is restless or irritable when attempting to cut down or stop gambling, Has made repeated unsuccessful efforts to control, cut back, or stop gambling, Is often preoccupied with gambling (e.g., having persistent thoughts of reliving past gambling experiences, handicapping or planning the next venture, thinking of ways to get money with which to gamble),Often gambles when feeling distressed (e.g., helpless, guilty, anxious, depressed), After losing money gambling, often returns another day to get even ("chasing" one's losses)

Financial infidelity

The tendency to be omissive or keep secrets about financial spendings by possessing credit cards, creating secret accounts or assets, borrowing money and accruing debt without their spouse, or significant other being aware of their spendings. Financial infidelity may be on the rise, with a 2005 study showing that 30% of respondents had lied about financial information and 25% had withheld information, whereas a 2008 study showed that half the respondents had committed some form of financial infidelity.

Compulsive Spending

This symptom usually occurs when an individual feels out of control. It can bring problems to the individual's life, who is advised to seek help before spending a significant portion of their income on discretionary purchases. It can take the form of the accumulation of a large amount of consumer debt; continuous spending, despite resolutions to stop; hiding of purchases from loved ones; being more excited about making the purchases than owning the items. The person might feel a sense of shame after purchasing something. The cause of this symptom usually deals with coping with stress, pain, and trauma.

Treatment
Cognitive-behavioral therapy

This treatment can help the individual develop self-esteem independency from their possessions. Treatment involving CBT has been shown to be effective in reducing compulsive symptoms. Seeking a psychologist to treat these symptoms have been related to a subcategory of OCD, which can help with related symptoms when involving treatment. Some compulsive spenders have sought out treatment through 12-step programs such as Debtors Anonymous.

Cause
Money Avoidance

When money avoidance includes underspending and recessive risk aversion it includes two subcategories which are financial denial and financial rejection. When facing financial denial the individual would simply refuse their money problems by not facing reality, for example, avoiding to look at bank statements or avoiding to pay an overdue credit card bill. Financial rejection is when the individual is feeling guilty whenever money is being accumulated and causes very low self esteem. 

Money worshipping

Money worship falls under the individual being obsessed with obtaining more money and simply believing that the only way to progress in life would be to obtain more money at the same time believing no matter the amount of money they accumulate won't meet their desires and wishes.

Further Research
Although this disorder isn't clinically recognized by the DSM, research is being conducted with time and this disorder may show in the DSM if enough research supports this disorder to be recognized. There is also evidence to suggest that individuals who experience money disorders or financial strain issues are also more likely to experience depression related symptoms like increased loneliness, lower self-esteem, and a smaller locus of control. In addition to this, these individuals also routinely report sleep difficulties and poorer health generally.

References 

Debt
Personal finance
Types of mental disorders